The Indigenous peoples of South America or South American Indigenous peoples, are the pre-Colombian peoples of South America and their descendants. These peoples contrast with South Americans of European ancestry and those of African descent.

In Spanish, Indigenous people are often referred to as indígenas or pueblos indígenas (lit. Indigenous peoples). They may also be called pueblos nativos or nativos (lit. Native peoples). The term aborigen (lit. aborigine) is used in Argentina and pueblos aborígenes (lit. aboriginal peoples) is commonly used in Colombia. The English term "Amerindian" (short for "Indians of the Americas") is often used in the Guianas. Latin Americans of mixed European and Indigenous descent are usually referred to as mestizos (Spanish) and mestiços (Portuguese). While those of mixed African and Indigenous ancestry are referred to as zambos.

It is believed that the first human populations of South America either arrived from Asia into North America via the Bering Land Bridge and migrated southwards or alternatively from Polynesia across the Pacific. The earliest generally accepted archaeological evidence for human habitation in South America dates to 14,000 years ago, the Monte Verde site in Southern Chile. The descendants of these first inhabitants would become the indigenous populations of South America.

Before the Spanish colonization of the Americas, many of the indigenous peoples of South America were hunter-gatherers and indeed many still are, especially in the Amazonian area. Others, especially the Andean cultures, practised sophisticated agriculture, utilized advanced irrigation and kept domesticated livestock, such as llamas and alpacas.

In the present day, there are two South American countries where indigenous peoples constitute the largest ethnic group. These are Peru, where 45% are indigenous and Bolivia, where 62% of people identify as feeling a part of some indigenous group. 

South American indigenous peoples include:

Indigenous peoples in Argentina
Indigenous peoples in Bolivia
Indigenous peoples in Brazil
Indigenous peoples in Chile
Indigenous peoples in Colombia
Indigenous peoples in Ecuador
Indigenous peoples in French Guiana
Indigenous peoples in Guyana
Indigenous peoples in Paraguay
Indigenous peoples in Peru
Indigenous peoples in Suriname
Indigenous peoples in Uruguay
Indigenous peoples in Venezuela

See also
 Indigenous peoples of the Americas
 Wars involving indigenous peoples of South America
 List of indigenous peoples
 Ceramics of indigenous peoples of the Americas

References

External links

 ATLILLA – Association for Teaching and Learning Indigenous Languages of Latin America

 
 
-
Ethnic groups in French Guiana
Indigenous peoples in French Guiana